The St Francis Xavier Church (katholische Kirche St. Franziskus Xaverius or Katholische Pfarrkirche zu Dresden-Neustadt) was a Roman Catholic church dedicated to St Francis Xavier in the Innere Neustadt district of Dresden. It was built from 1852 to 1853, severely damaged by bombing in 1945 in the Second World War, and demolished in 1957.

References 

Former churches in Dresden
Roman Catholic churches in Dresden
Buildings and structures demolished in 1957
Destroyed churches in Germany